The Zhongxing Landmark is a mid-size SUV designed and developed by Hebei Zhongxing Automobile.

Overview

Zhongxing is currently selling Zhongxing Landmark in China, and also internationally in Asia, Africa, Iran (Bahman Motor) and Egypt. There are currently plans to sell various models in Europe. Zxauto, in partnership with ZX Auto NA, is planning to export the Landmark SUV to the United States in the fourth quarter of 2008. The Landmark was planned to be upgraded for the U.S. market to include more features, but the plan to expand to the U.S. market never succeeded, and production ceased in 2013. Zhongxing Landmark will be equipped with a  turbocharged and fuel injected engine and provide 25-30 miles per gallon fuel efficiency.

References

External links
Zhongxing Landmark official site 
Zhongxing Landmark official site 
Benefits Of Mobile Windshield Replacement

Mid-size sport utility vehicles
All-wheel-drive vehicles

2010s cars
Cars introduced in 2006
Cars of China